The Landsmannschaft Weichsel-Warthe Bundesverband is an organization of German refugees expelled from their homes in modern-day Poland after World War II. The organization is based in Wiesbaden, and it was founded in 1949.

See also 
Expulsion of Germans after World War II
Federation of Expellees
Flight and expulsion of Germans (1944–1950)

Landsmannschaften